The Senate of Buenos Aires Province is the upper house of the Legislature of Buenos Aires Province, the largest and most populous of Argentina's provinces. It comprises 43 members elected in eight multi-member constituencies known as Electoral Sections. The number of senators that correspond to each of the electoral sections is proportional to their population, as observed in the results of every nationwide census conducted in Argentina every 10 years. Seats may only be added to adjust the proportionality of each section, but never reduced. 

As in the National Chamber of Deputies and most other provincial legislatures, elections to the Senate are held every two years, so that half of its members are up in each election. The same system is employed in the provincial Chamber of Deputies. 

The Senate was established with the promulgation of the Constitution of the State of Buenos Aires, a short-lived secessionist state, in 1854. Originally located in the City of Buenos Aires, the provincial legislature was moved to La Plata following that city's establishment in 1882. The body meets in the Legislative Palace, designed by Hannover architects Gustav Heine and Georg Hagemann in 1883 and completed in 1888.

List of presidents of the Senate
The Senate is chaired by the vice governor of the province, who is elected alongside the governor every four years. The Vice Governor may only cast tie-breaking votes (according to article 93 of the provincial constitution). The following is a list of vice governors of Buenos Aires since the return of democracy in 1983.

References

External links

Buenos Aires Province
Legislature of Buenos Aires Province
1854 establishments in Argentina
Government of Argentina
Buenos Aires